Heston and Isleworth was a local government district of Middlesex, England from 1894 to 1965.

Boundaries and background
The urban district was created on their mass creation in 1894 on approximately the same boundaries of the medieval parishes of the same names. A town hall was completed in 1905. It gained the status of municipal borough in 1932.  In 1894 the two parishes were formed into one urban district except for the small minority of Heston north of the Grand Junction Canal , which was transferred to Southall Urban District.

In 1934, the minority of Cranford parish east of the Crane  was added to the borough and overall generous adjustments were made in its boundaries with Twickenham, Brentford and Chiswick, and Southall-Norwood.

Areas also included within boundaries
Before 1894 but in the late 19th century new ecclesiastical parishes, hence neighbourhoods in the traditional definition, had been legally recognised within the large parishes: four in Hounslow and churches in Spring Grove and Osterley parts of Isleworth.  Due to the multitude of other competing settlement names within these catch-all original parishes:

 Old Isleworth
 Spring Grove
 Osterley
 Syon Lane
 North Hyde
 Sutton Green
 Hounslow
 Hounslow East
 Hounslow West
 Lampton
 Worton
 Wyke 
 Scrattage (completely defunct)

there is substantial overlap today in these and varied preference for names of London neighbourhoods, and the wards of the United Kingdom may conflict with definitive personal preference, such as use of the 19th century names in planning the estates in this area, Conservation Area names, individual development names, or original hamlet names.

Successor
In 1965 the municipal borough was abolished and its former area transferred to Greater London to be combined with the Municipal Borough of Brentford and Chiswick to the east and the Feltham Urban District to the south-west to form the London Borough of Hounslow. Minor loss of land, much smaller than any single original parish, took place on 1 April 1965 to the new London Boroughs of Ealing and Richmond upon Thames.

Coat of arms
The arms of Heston and Isleworth were granted in 1932. They were: Tierced in pairle Azure, Sable and gules in chief two wings conjoined argent to the dexter a cross bottonée or and to the sinister a lion rampant guardant per fesse of the last and or the fourth. The motto was 'UNITATE FORTIOR' (Latin: Stronger by union).
The silver wings on blue referred to Heston Aerodrome. The gold cross bottony came from the seal of the Monastery of St. Saviour and St. Brigit of Syon, founded in 1416 at Twickenham by King Henry V and moved to the site on which Syon House now stands circa 1431. The gold and silver lion came from the arms of Hounslow Priory, founded in the thirteenth century by the Trinitarian Brothers of Redemption, on the site now occupied by Holy Trinity Church. The motto referred to the union of the two formerly separate parishes of Heston and Isleworth.

References

External links
A Vision of Britain - Heston and Isleworth MB

Districts abolished by the London Government Act 1963
Districts of England created by the Local Government Act 1894
History of the London Borough of Hounslow
Municipal boroughs of England
History of local government in Middlesex
Isleworth